All the Love in the World may refer to:

Albums
All the Love in the World (Mac Davis album)

Songs
"All the Love in the World" (Dionne Warwick song), from the album Heartbreaker (1982)
"All the Love in the World" (The Corrs song), from the album In Blue (2001)
"All the Love in the World" (Nine Inch Nails song), from the album With Teeth (2005)
"All the Love in the World", a 1969 single by British psychedelic group Consortium written by Geoff Simpson
"All the Love in the World", a single released from the Korgis album Sticky George (1981)
"All the Love" (The Outfield song), also known as "All the Love in the World"

See also
"Not for All the Love in the World", a single by The Thrills from the album Let's Bottle Bohemia